Dennis C. Vacco (born August 16, 1952) is an American lawyer and Republican Party politician. He graduated with a B.A. from Colgate University in 1974, a J.D. from the University at Buffalo Law School in 1978, and was admitted to the New York State bar in 1979. He is to date the last Republican to serve as New York Attorney General.

Background
Vacco was born in Buffalo, New York, and was raised in the western region of upstate New York.

Political career

As Erie County Assistant District Attorney
Vacco was an Assistant District Attorney of Erie County, New York from 1978 to 1988, and United States Attorney for the Western District of New York from 1988 until the beginning of the Clinton administration in 1993.

As Attorney General of New York
Vacco was the Attorney General of New York from January 1, 1995 to December 31, 1998.

1994 election

In 1994, Vacco defeated Karen Burstein, the Democratic nominee. One week before the election, Staten Island Borough President Guy Molinari announced that Burstein was not qualified to serve as attorney general because she was a lesbian. The combination of Molinari's remarks, a strong national Republican showing, and the win of George Pataki in the governor's race, led to Vacco narrowly defeating Burstein. The New York Times called Molinari's remarks, "gutter politics."

Selected cases

Vacco brought national attention through a series of prosecutions brought against internet service providers, including Dreamscape Online, for distributing child pornography. The principal defendant, Buffnet, eventually pleaded guilty to a charge of fourth degree facilitation of a felony and was fined $5,000.

Vacco played a prominent role in New York City Mayor Rudy Giuliani's attempt to require Time Warner Cable to carry the Fox News Channel. An attempt by Vacco to bring an anti-trust violation charge against Time-Warner failed.

As attorney general, Vacco also argued the landmark assisted suicide case Vacco v. Quill before the United States Supreme Court. He successfully defended the state's ban on the practice, winning the case by a 9–0 vote.

1998 Election
In 1998, Vacco was defeated in his bid for re-election by Democrat Eliot Spitzer, by a margin of approximately 0.6% of the votes cast. He was the first attorney general in New York since 1925 to not be re-elected to a second term.

Electoral history

Vacco's electoral history has been tracked, online, at Our Campaigns, and it has been reflected here.

|-

Vacco also ran on the Conservative Party of New York ticket in this election.

|-

Nancy Rosenstock also received 13,416 votes (0.29%) for the Socialist Workers Party in this election.
Vacco also ran on both the Conservative Party of New York and Tax Cut Now tickets in this election.

Post-political career

Less than two months after he concluded an antitrust settlement with Waste Management, Inc., a waste disposal conglomerate, as one of his last acts before leaving his position as attorney general, Vacco joined Waste Management as a senior lobbyist and vice president for government affairs for their operations in New York, New England, and Canada. In response to questions about the settlement and the job offer, Vacco said: "Any interpretation or suggestion that this settlement - which included the United States Department of Justice - was connected to my employment by Waste Management - is preposterous and false."

As a lobbyist in New York State, Vacco was identified as having made inconsistencies in required filings. In April 2006, after a six-month investigation, Vacco was cleared of allegations that he violated lobbying regulations. The investigation "centered on whether Vacco’s firm had an illegal contingency-fee contract with a Rochester businessman in exchange for helping him win a casino deal with an Oklahoma tribe." In October 2005, Vacco’s lobbying firm agreed to pay the state $50,000 in connection with the questionable contract, but it was not required to admit wrongdoing."

Vacco is currently a partner in the Buffalo, New York law firm of Lippes Mathias Wexler Friedman, LLP.

In 2017, Vacco unsuccessful defended controversial Buffalo School Board member, Carl Paladino after his employment was terminated for misuse of confidential information and making what many called racist comments about former president Barack Obama during a magazine interview. After a hearing before the New York State education committee, it was determined that the Buffalo School Board had the right to terminate Carl Paladino’s employment, no further legal action was taken by either parties involved.

References

1952 births
Living people
United States Attorneys for the Western District of New York
New York State Attorneys General
New York (state) Republicans
Politicians from Buffalo, New York
Colgate University alumni
University at Buffalo Law School alumni
Lawyers from Buffalo, New York